Silent agitators (also called silent organizers and stickerettes) are stickers used by the Industrial Workers of the World (IWW).

The IWW publication Industrial Worker of Spokane, Washington, advertised stickers as early as April 20, 1911. 

Sociologist Eric Margolis has written about the history of such media:

Silent agitators were produced by the millions. Margolis described the way such stickers were used when the Wobblies called a strike in 1927:

IWW leader Big Bill Haywood described in his autobiography how the IWW issued stickers to propagandize against the war. The stickers declared, "Why be a soldier? Be a man. Join the I.W.W. and fight on the job for yourself and your class."

References

See also
 Industrial Workers of the World philosophy and tactics
 Wobbly lingo
 Black cat

Industrial Workers of the World culture
Propaganda
Stickers